The Height of the Scream is a collection of horror stories by author Ramsey Campbell.  Released in 1976 in an edition of 4,348 copies, it was the author's third collection of stories to be published by Arkham House.

It has since been reissued in various formats, most recently in a 2004 trade paperback from Babbage Press with a new introduction.

Contents

The Height of the Scream contains the following stories:

"Introduction and Allergies"
 "The Scar"
 "The Whining"
 "The Dark Show"
 "Missing"
 "Reply Guaranteed"
 "Jack's Little Friend"
 "Beside the Seaside"
 "The Cellars"
 "The Height of the Scream"
 "Litter"
 "Cyril"
 "Smoke Kiss"
 "The Words that Count"
 "Ash"
 "The Telephones"
 "In the Shadows"
 "Second Chance"
 "Horror House of Blood"

Sources

1976 short story collections
Horror short story collections
Arkham House books